The Socialist Party of Menorca (PSM or PSM-menorca) is a democratic socialist, environmentalist and Catalan nationalist political party in the island of Menorca, Balearic Isles, Spain. It is the major party in the More for Menorca coalition.

History
The party appeared as the merger of two socialist parties of Menorca, the Socialist Movement of Menorca and the Federalist Movement of Menorca, in 1977. In 1995 the youth wing of the party, Joventuts d'Esquerra Nacionalista was created.

References

External links
 Partit Socialista de Menorca - Official webpage

Political parties in the Balearic Islands
Political parties established in 1977
Socialist parties in Spain
1977 establishments in the Balearic Islands